SS William J. Bryan was a Liberty ship built in the United States during World War II. She was named after William J. Bryan, a member of the US House of Representatives from Nebraska, a three time Democratic Party presidential nominee, and United States Secretary of State under Woodrow Wilson.

Construction
William J. Bryan was laid down on 21 September 1942, under a Maritime Commission (MARCOM) contract, MC hull 1522, by J.A. Jones Construction, Panama City, Florida; she was launched on 22 April 1943.

History
She was allocated to the Standard Fruit & Steamship Company, on 20 May 1943. On 10 June 1946, she was laid up in the National Defense Reserve Fleet, in the Hudson River Group. On 26 March 1948, she was laid up in the National Defense Reserve Fleet, in Wilmington, North Carolina. On 20 July 1965, she was sold for $45,278.78, to Union Minerals and Alloys Corporation, for scrapping. She was removed from the fleet on 20 August 1965.

References

Bibliography

 
 
 
 

 

Liberty ships
Ships built in Panama City, Florida
1943 ships
Hudson River Reserve Fleet
Wilmington Reserve Fleet